The Captains may refert to:

 The Captains (film), a 2011 feature documentary
 The Captains (band), a Japanese band